Tenuirostritermes is a genus of termites in the family Termitidae. There are about five described species in Tenuirostritermes.

Species
These five species belong to the genus Tenuirostritermes:
 Tenuirostritermes briciae (Snyder, 1922)
 Tenuirostritermes cinereus (Buckley, 1862)
 Tenuirostritermes incisus (Snyder, 1922)
 Tenuirostritermes strenuus (Hagen, 1860)
 Tenuirostritermes tenuirostris (Desneux, 1904)

References

Further reading

 

Termites
Articles created by Qbugbot